This is a list of 356 species in the genus Cyclocephala, masked chafers.

Cyclocephala species

 Cyclocephala abrelata Ratcliffe & Cave, 2002 c g
 Cyclocephala acoma Ratcliffe, 2008 c g
 Cyclocephala acuta Arrow, 1902 c g
 Cyclocephala aequatoria Endrödi, 1963 c g
 Cyclocephala affinis Endrödi, 1966 c g
 Cyclocephala alazonia Ratcliffe, 2003 c g
 Cyclocephala alexi Ratcliffe & Delgado, 1990 c g
 Cyclocephala almitana Dechambre, 1992 c g
 Cyclocephala altamontana Dechambre, 1999 c g
 Cyclocephala alutacea Höhne, 1923 c g
 Cyclocephala alvarengai Dechambre, 1980 c g
 Cyclocephala amazona (Linnaeus, 1767) c g
 Cyclocephala amblyopsis Bates, 1888 c g
 Cyclocephala ampliata Bates, 1888 c g
 Cyclocephala amplitarsis Ratcliffe, 1992 c g
 Cyclocephala angularis (Knoch, 1801) c g
 Cyclocephala anibali Joly, 2009 c g
 Cyclocephala aravaipensis Ratcliffe, 1992 i c g
 Cyclocephala arenosa Howden and Endrödi, 1966 i c g
 Cyclocephala arnaudi Dechambre, 1980 c g
 Cyclocephala arrowiana Martinez, 1967 c g
 Cyclocephala atricapilla Mannerheim, 1829 c g
 Cyclocephala atriceps (Casey, 1915) c g
 Cyclocephala atricolor Chapin, 1932 c g
 Cyclocephala atripes Bates, 1888 c g
 Cyclocephala aulustjaorum Hielkema, 2017 c g
 Cyclocephala barrerai Martínez, 1969 i c g
 Cyclocephala batesi Delgado-Castillo & Castaneda, 1994 c g
 Cyclocephala bella Endrödi, 1969 c g
 Cyclocephala berti Delgado-Castillo, 1992 c g
 Cyclocephala bicolor Castelnau, 1840 c g
 Cyclocephala bicolorata Endrödi, 1964 c g
 Cyclocephala bimaculata Dechambre, 1999 c g
 Cyclocephala binotata Dechambre, 1999 c g
 Cyclocephala bleuzeni Dechambre, 1995 c g
 Cyclocephala boliviana Dechambre, 1997 c g
 Cyclocephala bollei Dechambre & Endrodi, 1984 c g
 Cyclocephala borburatae Endrödi, 1980 c g
 Cyclocephala borealis Arrow, 1911 i c g b  (northern masked chafer)
 Cyclocephala boucheri Dechambre, 1997 c g
 Cyclocephala boulardi Dechambre, 1979 c g
 Cyclocephala brasiliana Endrödi, 1966 c g
 Cyclocephala brevipennis Endrödi, 1985 c g
 Cyclocephala brevis Höhne, 1923 g
 Cyclocephala brittoni Endrödi, 1964 c g
 Cyclocephala burmeisteri Endrödi, 1964 c g
 Cyclocephala caelestis Delgado and Ratcliffe, 1990 i c g
 Cyclocephala camachicola Ohaus, 1910 c g
 Cyclocephala capitata Höhne, 1923 c g
 Cyclocephala carbonaria Arrow, 1911 c g
 Cyclocephala cardini Chapin, 1935 c g
 Cyclocephala carinatipennis Martinez & Morón, 1984 c g
 Cyclocephala cartwighti Endrödi, 1964 g
 Cyclocephala cartwrighti Endrödi, 1964 c g
 Cyclocephala casanova Ratcliffe & Cave, 2009 c g
 Cyclocephala castanea (Olivier, 1789) c g
 Cyclocephala castaniella Bates, 1888 c g
 Cyclocephala caussaneli Dechambre, 1999 c g
 Cyclocephala cearae Höhne, 1923 c g
 Cyclocephala celata Dechambre, 1980 c g
 Cyclocephala cerea Burmeister, 1847 c g
 Cyclocephala chalumeaui Martinez, 1978 c g
 Cyclocephala chera Ratcliffe, 2008 c g
 Cyclocephala chiquita Ratcliffe, 2008 c g
 Cyclocephala colasi Endrödi, 1964 c g
 Cyclocephala collaris Burmeister, 1847 c g
 Cyclocephala comata Bates, 1888 i c g
 Cyclocephala compacta Ratcliffe, 2008 c g
 Cyclocephala complanata Burmeister, 1847 c g
 Cyclocephala concolor Burmeister, 1847 c g
 Cyclocephala confusa Endrödi, 1966 c g
 Cyclocephala conspicua Sharp, 1877 c g
 Cyclocephala contraria Kirsch, 1873 c g
 Cyclocephala coriacea Dechambre, 1992 c g
 Cyclocephala couturieri Dechambre, 1999 c g
 Cyclocephala crassa Endrödi, 1967 c g
 Cyclocephala crepuscularis Martinez, 1954 c g
 Cyclocephala cribrata Burmeister, 1847 c g
 Cyclocephala curta Bates, 1888 c g
 Cyclocephala dalensi Ponchel, 2009 c g
 Cyclocephala deceptor (Casey, 1915) i c g
 Cyclocephala decorella Endrödi, 1966 c g
 Cyclocephala defecta Endrödi, 1970 c g
 Cyclocephala deltoides Ratcliffe, 1992 c g
 Cyclocephala dichroa Dechambre, 1992 c g
 Cyclocephala dilatata (Prell, 1934) c g
 Cyclocephala diluta Erichson, 1847 c g
 Cyclocephala discicollis Arrow, 1902 c g
 Cyclocephala discolor (Herbst, 1790) c g
 Cyclocephala dispar (Herbst, 1790) c g
 Cyclocephala distincta Burmeister, 1847 c g
 Cyclocephala divaricata Joly, 2005 c g
 Cyclocephala dolichotarsa Ratcliffe & Cave, 2008 c g
 Cyclocephala dominicana Endrödi, 1985 c g
 Cyclocephala duodecimpunctata Endrödi, 1966 c g
 Cyclocephala dupuisi Ratcliffe, 2014 c g
 Cyclocephala durantonorum Dechambre, 1999 c g
 Cyclocephala dyscinetoides Dechambre, 1999 c g
 Cyclocephala emarginata Endrödi, 1966 c g
 Cyclocephala endroedii Martinez, 1965 c g
 Cyclocephala endroedy-youngai Endrödi, 1964 c g
 Cyclocephala englemani (Ratcliffe, 1977) c g
 Cyclocephala enigma Ratcliffe, 2003 c g
 Cyclocephala epistomalis Bates, 1888 c g
 Cyclocephala ergastuli Dechambre, 1997 c g
 Cyclocephala erotylina Arrow, 1914 c g
 Cyclocephala everardoi Grossi, Santos & Almeida, 2016 c g
 Cyclocephala falsa (Arrow, 1911) c g
 Cyclocephala fankhaeneli Endrödi, 1964 c g
 Cyclocephala fasciolata Bates, 1888 c g
 Cyclocephala ferruginea (Fabricius, 1801) c g
 Cyclocephala figurata Burmeister, 1847 c g
 Cyclocephala flavipennis Arrow, 1914 c g
 Cyclocephala flavoscutellaris Höhne, 1923 c g
 Cyclocephala flora Arrow, 1911 c g
 Cyclocephala forcipulata Howden and Endrödi, 1966 i c g
 Cyclocephala forsteri Endrödi, 1963 c g
 Cyclocephala freudei Endrödi, 1963 i c g
 Cyclocephala freyi Endrödi, 1964 c g
 Cyclocephala frontalis Chevrolat, 1844 c g
 Cyclocephala fulgurata Burmeister, 1847 c g
 Cyclocephala fulvipennis Burmeister, 1847 c g
 Cyclocephala gabaldoni Martinez & Martinez, 1981 c g
 Cyclocephala genieri Joly, 2010 c g
 Cyclocephala gigantea Dupuis, 1999 c g
 Cyclocephala goetzi Endrödi, 1966 c g
 Cyclocephala gravis Bates, 1888 c g
 Cyclocephala gregaria Heyne & Taschenberg, 1908 c g
 Cyclocephala guaguarum Dechambre & Endrodi, 1984 c g
 Cyclocephala guianae Endrödi, 1969 c g
 Cyclocephala guttata Bates, 1888 c g
 Cyclocephala guycolasi Dechambre, 1992 c g
 Cyclocephala halffteriana Martinez, 1968 c g
 Cyclocephala hardyi Endrödi, 1975 c g
 Cyclocephala hartmannorum Maly, 2006 c g
 Cyclocephala helavai Endrödi, 1975 c g
 Cyclocephala herteli Endrödi, 1964 c g
 Cyclocephala hiekei Endrödi, 1964 c g
 Cyclocephala hirsuta Höhne, 1923 c g
 Cyclocephala hirta Leconte, 1861 i c g b
 Cyclocephala histrionica Burmeister, 1847 c g
 Cyclocephala holmbergi Martinez, 1968 c g
 Cyclocephala howdenannae Endrödi, 1975 c g
 Cyclocephala husingi Endrödi, 1964 c g
 Cyclocephala iani Ratcliffe, 1992 c g
 Cyclocephala immaculata (Olivier, 1789) c g
 Cyclocephala inca Endrödi, 1966 c g
 Cyclocephala insulicola Arrow, 1937 c g
 Cyclocephala isabellina Höhne, 1923 c g
 Cyclocephala isthmiensis Ratcliffe, 1992 c g
 Cyclocephala italoi Dupuis, 1999 c g
 Cyclocephala jalapensis Casey, 1915 c g
 Cyclocephala jauffreti Dechambre, 1979 c g
 Cyclocephala kahanoffae Martinez, 1975 c g
 Cyclocephala kaszabi Endrödi, 1964 c g
 Cyclocephala kechua (Martinez, 1957) c g
 Cyclocephala knobelae (Brown, 1934) i c g
 Cyclocephala krombeini Endrödi, 1979 c g
 Cyclocephala kuntzeniana Höhne, 1923 c g
 Cyclocephala labidion Ratcliffe, 2003 c g
 Cyclocephala lachaumei Dechambre, 1992 c g
 Cyclocephala laevis Arrow, 1937 c g
 Cyclocephala lamarcki Dechambre, 1999 c g
 Cyclocephala laminata Burmeister, 1847 c g
 Cyclocephala larssoni Endrödi, 1964 c g
 Cyclocephala latericia Höhne, 1923 c g
 Cyclocephala latipennis Arrow, 1911 c g
 Cyclocephala latreillei Dechambre, 1999 c g
 Cyclocephala lecourti Dechambre, 1992 c g
 Cyclocephala letiranti Young, 1992 c g
 Cyclocephala lichyi Dechambre, 1980 c g
 Cyclocephala ligyrina Bates, 1888 c g
 Cyclocephala lineata Dupuis, 2008 c g
 Cyclocephala lineigera Höhne, 1923 c g
 Cyclocephala liomorpha Arrow, 1911 c g
 Cyclocephala literata Burmeister, 1847 c g
 Cyclocephala lizeri Martinez, 1964 c g
 Cyclocephala longa Endrödi, 1963 c g
 Cyclocephala longicollis Burmeister, 1847 c g
 Cyclocephala longimana Dechambre, 1980 c g
 Cyclocephala longitarsis Dechambre, 1999 c g
 Cyclocephala longula Leconte, 1863 i c g b
 Cyclocephala lunulata Burmeister, 1847 i c g b
 Cyclocephala lurida Bland, 1863 i c g b  (southern masked chafer)
 Cyclocephala lutea Endrödi, 1966 c g
 Cyclocephala machadoi Grossi, Santos & Almeida, 2016 c g
 Cyclocephala macrophylla Erichson, 1847 c g
 Cyclocephala maculata Burmeister, 1847 c g
 Cyclocephala maculiventris Höhne, 1923 c g
 Cyclocephala mafaffa Burmeister, 1847 i c g
 Cyclocephala magdalenae Young & Le Tirant, 2005 c g
 Cyclocephala malleri Martinez, 1968 c g
 Cyclocephala malyi Dupuis, 2014 c g
 Cyclocephala mannheimsi Endrödi, 1964 c g
 Cyclocephala marginalis Kirsch, 1871 c g
 Cyclocephala marginicollis Arrow, 1902 c g
 Cyclocephala marianista Dechambre & Endrodi, 1984 c g
 Cyclocephala marqueti Dechambre, 1997 c g
 Cyclocephala martinezi Endrödi, 1964 c g
 Cyclocephala marylizae Ratcliffe, 2003 c g
 Cyclocephala mathani Dechambre, 1982 c g
 Cyclocephala mechae Martinez, 1978 c g
 Cyclocephala mecynotarsis Höhne, 1923 c g
 Cyclocephala megalophylla Endrödi, 1966 c g
 Cyclocephala meinanderi Endrödi, 1964 c g
 Cyclocephala melanae Bates, 1888 c g
 Cyclocephala melanocephala (Fabricius, 1775) i c g b
 Cyclocephala melanopoda Ratcliffe, 2008 c g
 Cyclocephala melolonthida Ratcliffe & Cave, 2002 c g
 Cyclocephala mesophylla Mora-Aguilar & Delgado, 2012 c g
 Cyclocephala metrica Steinheil, 1872 c g
 Cyclocephala miamiensis Howden and Endrödi, 1966 i c g
 Cyclocephala minuchae Joly, 2003 c g
 Cyclocephala minuta Burmeister, 1847 c g
 Cyclocephala modesta Burmeister, 1847 c g
 Cyclocephala molesta Endrödi, 1969 c g
 Cyclocephala monacha Ratcliffe, 2008 c g
 Cyclocephala monzoni Ratcliffe & Cave, 2009 c g
 Cyclocephala moreti Dechambre, 1992 c g
 Cyclocephala morphoidina Prell, 1937 c g
 Cyclocephala multiplex Casey, 1915 c g
 Cyclocephala munda Kirsch, 1870 c g
 Cyclocephala mustacha Ratcliffe, 2003 c g
 Cyclocephala mutata Harold, 1869 c g
 Cyclocephala nana Dechambre, 1999 c g
 Cyclocephala nigerrima Bates, 1888 c g
 Cyclocephala nigra Dechambre, 1999 c
 Cyclocephala nigricollis Burmeister, 1847 i
 Cyclocephala nigritarsis Ratcliffe, 1992 c g
 Cyclocephala nigrobasalis Höhne, 1923 c g
 Cyclocephala nigropicta Dechambre & Endrodi, 1983 c g
 Cyclocephala niguasa Dechambre & Endrodi, 1984 c g
 Cyclocephala nike Ratcliffe, 1992 c g
 Cyclocephala nodanotherwon Ratcliffe, 1992 c g
 Cyclocephala notata (Illiger, 1806) c g
 Cyclocephala obscura Endrödi, 1966 c g
 Cyclocephala occipitalis Fairmaire, 1892 c g
 Cyclocephala ocellata Burmeister, 1847 c g
 Cyclocephala ochracea Prell, 1937 c g
 Cyclocephala octopunctata Burmeister, 1847 c g
 Cyclocephala ohausiana Höhne, 1923 c g
 Cyclocephala olivieri Arrow, 1911 c g
 Cyclocephala ovulum Bates, 1888 c g
 Cyclocephala pan Ratcliffe, 1992 c g
 Cyclocephala panthera Dechambre, 1979 c g
 Cyclocephala paraflora Martinez, 1978 c g
 Cyclocephala paraguayensis Arrow, 1903 c g
 Cyclocephala parallela (Casey, 1915) i c b
 Cyclocephala pardolocarnoi Dechambre, 1995 c g
 Cyclocephala pasadenae (Casey, 1915) i c g b
 Cyclocephala perconfusa Dechambre, 1992 c g
 Cyclocephala pereirai (Martinez, 1960) c g
 Cyclocephala perforata Arrow, 1913 c g
 Cyclocephala perplexa Ratcliffe, 2008 c g
 Cyclocephala peruana Endrödi, 1966 c g
 Cyclocephala pichinchana Dechambre, 1992 c g
 Cyclocephala picipes (Olivier, 1789) c g
 Cyclocephala picta Burmeister, 1847 c g
 Cyclocephala pilosa Dupuis, 2006 c g
 Cyclocephala pilosicollis Saylor, 1936 i c g
 Cyclocephala pokornyi Dupuis, 2014 c g
 Cyclocephala pompanoni Dechambre, 1979 c g
 Cyclocephala poncheli Dechambre & Duranton, 2005 c g
 Cyclocephala porioni Dechambre, 1979 c g
 Cyclocephala prelli Endrödi, 1967 c g
 Cyclocephala prolongata Arrow, 1902 c g
 Cyclocephala proxima Dechambre, 1997 c g
 Cyclocephala pseudoconfusa Ratcliffe, 1992 c g
 Cyclocephala pseudomelanocephala Dupuis, 1996 c g
 Cyclocephala puberula LeConte, 1863 i c g
 Cyclocephala pugnax Arrow, 1914 c g
 Cyclocephala pulchra Dechambre, 1999 c g
 Cyclocephala puncticollis Endrödi, 1966 c g
 Cyclocephala putrida Burmeister, 1847 c g
 Cyclocephala pygidialis Joly, 2000 c g
 Cyclocephala pygidiata Dupuis, 1999 c g
 Cyclocephala quadripunctata Höhne, 1923 c g
 Cyclocephala quatuordecimpunctata Mannerheim, 1829 c g
 Cyclocephala quercina Burmeister, 1847 c g
 Cyclocephala quisqueya Joly, 1998 c g
 Cyclocephala rangelana Chapin, 1935 c g
 Cyclocephala ratcliffei Endrödi, 1977 c g
 Cyclocephala recta Dupuis, 2008 c g
 Cyclocephala regularis Casey, 1915 i g
 Cyclocephala robusta LECONTE, 1863 c g b
 Cyclocephala rogezi Dechambre, 1992 c g
 Cyclocephala rondoniana Ratcliffe, 1992 c g
 Cyclocephala rorulenta Höhne, 1923 c g
 Cyclocephala rotundipenis Dupuis, 2009 c g
 Cyclocephala rubescens Bates, 1891 c g
 Cyclocephala rufa Endrödi, 1967 c g
 Cyclocephala rufescens Endrödi, 1967 c g
 Cyclocephala ruficollis Burmeister, 1847 c g
 Cyclocephala rufonigra Demay, 1838 c g
 Cyclocephala rufovaria Arrow, 1911 c g
 Cyclocephala rustica (Olivier, 1789) c g
 Cyclocephala saltini Ratcliffe, 2008 c g
 Cyclocephala sanguinicollis Burmeister, 1847 i c g
 Cyclocephala santaritae Ratcliffe, 1992 c g
 Cyclocephala sarahae Ratcliffe, 1992 c g
 Cyclocephala sardadebiae Dechambre & Duranton, 2005 c g
 Cyclocephala sarpedon Ratcliffe, 1992 c g
 Cyclocephala scarabaeina (Gyllenhal, 1817) c g
 Cyclocephala schmitzorum Ratcliffe, 1992 c g
 Cyclocephala seditiosa LeConte, 1863 i c g
 Cyclocephala setosa Burmeister, 1847 c g
 Cyclocephala sexpunctata Castelnau, 1840 c g
 Cyclocephala signaticollis Burmeister, 1847 c g
 Cyclocephala signatoides Höhne, 1923 c g
 Cyclocephala similis Dechambre, 1980 c g
 Cyclocephala simillima Dechambre, 1999 c g
 Cyclocephala simulatrix Höhne, 1923 c g
 Cyclocephala sinaloae Howden and Endrödi, 1966 i c g
 Cyclocephala sinuosa Höhne, 1923 c g
 Cyclocephala sororia Bates, 1888 i
 Cyclocephala spangleri Joly, 2000 c g
 Cyclocephala sparsa Arrow, 1902 i c g
 Cyclocephala spilopyga Erichson, 1847 c g
 Cyclocephala stictica Burmeister, 1847 c g
 Cyclocephala stockwelli Ratcliffe, 2003 c g
 Cyclocephala striata Endrödi, 1963 c g
 Cyclocephala subsignata Burmeister, 1847 c g
 Cyclocephala supernana Dechambre, 1999 c g
 Cyclocephala suturalis Ohaus, 1911 c g
 Cyclocephala sylviae Dechambre, 1995 c g
 Cyclocephala testacea Burmeister, 1847 i c g
 Cyclocephala tetrica Burmeister, 1847 c g
 Cyclocephala tidula Dechambre, 1999 c g
 Cyclocephala toulgoeti Dechambre, 1992 c g
 Cyclocephala tridentata (Fabricius, 1801) c g
 Cyclocephala tronchonii Martinez, 1975 c g
 Cyclocephala tucumana Brethes, 1904 c g
 Cyclocephala tutilina Burmeister, 1847 c g
 Cyclocephala tylifera Höhne, 1923 c g
 Cyclocephala unamas Ratcliffe, 2003 c g
 Cyclocephala undata (Olivier, 1789) c g
 Cyclocephala unidentata Endrödi, 1980 c g
 Cyclocephala variabilis Burmeister, 1847 i c g
 Cyclocephala varians Burmeister, 1847 c g
 Cyclocephala variipenis Dechambre, 1999 c g
 Cyclocephala variolosa Burmeister, 1847 c g
 Cyclocephala verticalis Burmeister, 1847 c g
 Cyclocephala vestita Höhne, 1923 c g
 Cyclocephala vidanoi Dechambre, 1992 c g
 Cyclocephala villosa Blanchard, 1846 c g
 Cyclocephala vincentiae Arrow, 1900 c g
 Cyclocephala vinosa Arrow, 1937 c g
 Cyclocephala virgo Dechambre, 1999 c g
 Cyclocephala viridis Dechambre, 1982 c g
 Cyclocephala vittoscutellaris Prell, 1937 c g
 Cyclocephala wandae Hardy, 1974 i c g
 Cyclocephala weidneri Endrödi, 1964 c g
 Cyclocephala williami Ratcliffe, 1992 c g
 Cyclocephala zischkai Martinez, 1965 c g
 Cyclocephala zodion Ratcliffe, 1992 c g
 Cyclocephala zurstrasseni Endrödi, 1964 c g

Data sources: i = ITIS, c = Catalogue of Life, g = GBIF, b = Bugguide.net

References

Cyclocephala